Béatrice Mottoulle (born 2 July 1956) is a Belgian former breaststroke swimmer. She competed in three events at the 1972 Summer Olympics.

References

External links
 

1956 births
Living people
Olympic swimmers of Belgium
Swimmers at the 1972 Summer Olympics
Sportspeople from Liège